Lethe scanda, the blue forester, is a species of satyrine butterfly found in parts of Asia. It is known from Sikkim and Bhutan.

This butterfly has a  wingspan. The male is a deep indigo blue on the upperside with the margins being paler. The females are darker brown with yellow subapical marks. Males have a tuft of black hairs on the second vein where it meets the median vein.

References

scanda
Butterflies described in 1857